The chestnut-bellied malkoha (Phaenicophaeus sumatranus) is a species of cuckoo in the family Cuculidae.
It is found in Brunei, Indonesia, Malaysia, Myanmar, Singapore, and Thailand.
Its natural habitats are subtropical or tropical moist lowland forest, subtropical or tropical mangrove forest, and subtropical or tropical swampland.
It is threatened by habitat loss.

Not to be confused with the chestnut-breasted malkoha.

References

chestnut-bellied malkoha
Birds of Malesia
chestnut-bellied malkoha
Taxonomy articles created by Polbot